Diamond Creek Falls is a waterfall formed along Gibson Canyon on the north end of Willamette National Forest, east side of the city of Oakridge in Lane County, Oregon. Access to Diamond Creek Falls is located along Oregon Route 58 through trail paths that lead down to the stream and the base of the waterfall.

Trail 
From the parking lot and to the left of the interpretive kiosk is the beginning of the  loop hike upstream of the waterfall on the Salt Creek Falls and Diamond Creek Falls trails. The Salt Creek Falls trail starts with a paved walkway along Salt Creek that leads to a picnic area. Past the picnic area is a bridge over Salt Creek that leads to a faint pathway where the trail divides. Past this viewpoint, the Diamond Creek Falls Trail continues for about  past Too Much Bear Lake and ends in a junction that leads to the waterfall, which has access to its base over basalt steps, fissures and boulders.

See also 
 List of waterfalls in Oregon

References

Waterfalls of Lane County, Oregon